Mimudea is a genus of moths of the family Crambidae described by William Warren in 1892.

Species
Mimudea aenealis (Hampson, 1913)
Mimudea albiflua (Hampson, 1913)
Mimudea albiluna (Hampson, 1913)
Mimudea brevialis Walker, 1859
Mimudea brunnealis Dognin, 1912
Mimudea brunneicilialis (Hampson, 1913)
Mimudea bryophilalis (Hampson, 1903)
Mimudea chalcitalis (Hampson, 1913)
Mimudea chalcochlora (Hampson, 1916)
Mimudea dichorda (Hampson, 1913)
Mimudea distictalis (Hampson, 1913)
Mimudea distictalis (Hampson, 1918)
Mimudea dithyralis Dognin, 1910
Mimudea ectophaealis (Hampson, 1913)
Mimudea flavinotata Warren, 1892
Mimudea fracidalis (E. Hering, 1901)
Mimudea fuscizonalis (Hampson, 1896)
Mimudea haematalis (Hampson, 1913)
Mimudea hyalopunctalis Dognin, 1912
Mimudea ignitalis (Hampson, 1913)
Mimudea impuralis (Snellen, 1875)
Mimudea lividalis Dognin, 1905
Mimudea longipalpalis (Hampson, 1903)
Mimudea mendicalis (South in Leech & South, 1901)
Mimudea obfuscalis (Dognin, 1905)
Mimudea obvialis (Hampson, 1913)
Mimudea octonalis (Snellen, 1890)
Mimudea olivalis Warren, 1892
Mimudea pallidalis (South in Leech & South, 1901)
Mimudea pectinalis (Hampson, 1913)
Mimudea permixtalis (Walker, 1865)
Mimudea phoenicistis (Hampson, 1896)
Mimudea poliosticta (Hampson, 1903)
Mimudea praepandalis (Snellen, 1890)
Mimudea punctiferalis (South in Leech & South, 1901)
Mimudea rocinalis (Dognin, 1897)
Mimudea selenographa (Meyrick, 1936)
Mimudea sthennymalis (Dyar, 1914)
Mimudea subochracealis (Pagenstecher, 1884)
Mimudea tisiasalis (Druce, 1899)
Mimudea trilampas Dognin, 1912
Mimudea tristigmalis (Hampson, 1918)

Former species
Mimudea bractealis (Kenrick, 1907)
Mimudea quadrimaculalis Dognin, 1908
Mimudea squamosa (Hampson, 1913)

References

Spilomelinae
Crambidae genera
Taxa named by William Warren (entomologist)